Coloris is a puzzle video game released in 1990 for the Amiga. It was published by Avesoft, a distributor of freeware and shareware disks.  Coloris is very similar to Sega's Columns, which itself is a variant of Tetris. 

A port to the Atari ST was only released as a preview; the full version was not published.

Gameplay
Blocks fall from top of the screen to a well. The blocks consist of three squares of different colours. The blocks cannot be rotated, but the order of the colours can be switched. If three or more squares of same colour are adjacent, they disappear, blocks above them fall down, and may trigger a chain reaction.

Reception
Jukka Tapanimäki wrote a glowing review for MikroBitti magazine.

References

1990 video games
Falling block puzzle games
Amiga games
Finland-exclusive video games
Video game clones
Video games developed in Finland